T-Bird at Ako is a 1982 Filipino film directed by Danny Zialcita starring two of the Philippines' most prolific actresses at the time Nora Aunor and Vilma Santos. Aunor also recorded the song "Hiwaga Ng Pag-ibig" featured in film.

The film depicts one of the earliest portrayals of LGBT themes in Philippine cinema during a time of heavier censorship and more conservative audiences. The word t-bird is a Filipino slang term for a butch lesbian. The screenplay was written by activist Portia Ilagan who is openly gay.

In 2015, 33 years after the film's original release, T-Bird at Ako was digitally restored and re-mastered as one of the 75 films restored by ABS-CBN Film Archives, in collaboration with Central Digital Labs.

Synopsis
Feisty lawyer Sylvia Salazar (Aunor) has made a name for herself but is still dissatisfied and uncertain, including her future with brilliant colleague Jake (Abuel) who persistently asks for her hand in marriage. As she witnesses a performance by a local dancer named Sabel (Santos) at a local bar, Sylvia realizes her attraction to her.

Sabel, who is a struggling burgis working several jobs suddenly finds herself in the center of a scandal when she is harassed and threatened to be raped by the son of a rich tycoon whom she ends up killing in self-defense. Sylvia hears of this and decides to help Sabel by posting her bail, representing her in court and providing for her now she is unemployed. While preparing for the case, Sylvia learns that Sabel gave birth to a son whom she gave up for adoption 7 years prior, and that the father is a married man who disappeared before learning of her pregnancy. As they continue to live in the same house, the two women begin to warm towards each other.

Later, Sabel gets a phone call from an anonymous man from her past who turns out to be Dante (Fernando), the father of her child. Looking to rekindle their romance, he confesses that they lost touch because he went to prison for seven years and that his wife is now dead and they are free to marry. Sylvia learns of Dante's return and fears it might interfere with her budding relationship with Sabel as well as her ongoing case so she sends her assistant Babette (Gonzales) to bribe Dante to disappear again. Sabel is devastated when Dante is nowhere to be found again but she soon figures out that it was Sylvia's doing. Sylvia finally admits her attraction to Sabel, who rejects her saying what she needs is a man, not another woman. Frustrated that she will have nothing if she runs away, Sabel finally gives in to Sylvia's desire for her "body" and tells her that after the case is won, Sylvia can do anything to her but her heart will not be in it.

During the trial, Sylvia proves that the man who attempted to rape Sabel (Israel) has a history of violence and drugs, justifying her plead for self-defense and she is released. As Sabel walks into the hotel room where she is supposed to consummate her relationship with Sylvia, she finds Dante instead, whom Sylvia had contacted. Later, Sylvia finally accepts Jake's suggestion that she dress "like a woman" and they share a kiss.

Cast
The film's supporting cast are mostly frequent collaborators of Danny Zialcita, including Suzanne Gonzales and Dindo Fernando.
  Nora Aunor as Sylvia
 Nora Aunor as Sylvia
 Dindo Fernando as Dante
 Tommy Abuel as Jake
 Suzanne Gonzales as Babette 
 Odette Khan as Maxie
 Dick Israel as Dickie
 Leila Hermosa	as Rubia
 Johnny Wilson	as Prosecutor
 Rosemarie Gil	as Mother
 Subas Herrero	as Father
 Liza Lorena as Foster Mother
 Alvin Enriquez as Tony
 Angie Salinas as Yaya

Critical reception
The direction is tight and masterful. Although one always gets reminded in a Zialcita film of sequences from foreign films, there is a minimum of unmotivated blocking in this film. Each sequence contributes to the whole film  (if there is copying, in other words, and I do think there is in this film, the copying is not done simply to be cute or clever, but in accordance with the logical requirements of the plot). - Isagani R. Cruz, Parade, September 22, 1982

References

External links

 
 T-Bird At Ako (1982) - oocities.org

Filipino-language films
Philippine crime drama films
1982 films
Films set in the Philippines
Star Cinema films
Films directed by Danny Zialcita
Philippine LGBT-related films
1982 LGBT-related films